The War Memorial Athletic Ground, often referred to as simply the War Memorial Ground, is a sports ground in the Amblecote region of Stourbridge, West Midlands, England. It plays host to both cricket and football, being the home of Stourbridge Cricket Club and Stourbridge Football Club.

Cricket

International
Two ICC Trophy matches have been played at the War Memorial Ground: Bermuda v Papua New Guinea in 1979, and Argentina v East Africa in 1986. The ground also hosted a match in the 1997 Triple Crown Tournament, between an England Cricket Board XI

and Ireland.

Domestic
Worcestershire County Cricket Club played 61 first-class matches at the ground: 60 between 1905 and 1962, and a further one in 1981. All these games were in the County Championship. Only three List A games have been played here, in 1969, 1970 and 1982, again all involving Worcestershire. The county played Second XI cricket at the ground into the early 1990s.

On this ground in 1911, Worcestershire lost to Lancashire by 372 runs, which as of the beginning of the 2009 season remains the county's largest ever defeat in terms of runs.
 In 1909 Frank Woolley and Arthur Fielder shared a partnership of 235 for Kent's 10th wicket, a stand which remains the highest for the 10th wicket in the County Championship as of 2021 and the fourth-highest of all time.

Records

First-class
 Highest team total: 592/9 declared by Lancashire v Worcestershire, 1909
 Lowest team total: 43 by Worcestershire v Kent, 1913
 Highest individual innings: 217 by Frederick Bowley for Worcestershire v Leicestershire, 1905
 Best bowling in an innings: 9-40 by Reg Perks for Worcestershire v Glamorgan, 1939

List A
 Highest team total: 164/9 (40 overs) by Worcestershire v Leicestershire, 1970
 Lowest team total: 104 (37.5 overs) by Glamorgan v Worcestershire, 1969
 Highest individual innings: 58 by Nigel Briers for Leicestershire v Worcestershire, 1982
 Best bowling in an innings: 4-24 by Bob Carter for Worcestershire v Leicestershire, 1970

Football

The War Memorial Athletic Ground is also the home of Stourbridge F.C. The ground hosted League One team Walsall in the FA Cup 1st round on 7 November 2009. The match finished in a 0–1 loss for Stourbridge. It also hosted a replay between Stourbridge and Plymouth Argyle in the FA Cup on 22 November 2011.

Notes

References
 Amblecote, Stourbridge from CricketArchive. (This is the only name CA gives to the ground.) Retrieved 19 December 2006.

Football venues in the West Midlands (county)
Welsh Cup final venues
Cricket grounds in the West Midlands (county)
Sports venues completed in 1905
World War I memorials in England
Stourbridge
1905 establishments in England